Sibblies is a Jamaican surname. Notable people with the surname include:

 Dwight Sibblies, Jamaican politician
 Jackie Sibblies Drury, American playwright
 Leroy Sibblies (born 1949), Jamaican musician and producer